State Planning Organization (DPT) was founded on September 30, 1960, as part of the NUC's plans to help Turkey recover from the rule of the DP (whose leader Adnan Menderes did not use state planning except partially in the agricultural sector).

It was one of the most important governmental organizations in Turkey. Its principal tasks were to provide advice to the government on the determination of economic, social and cultural goals of the state, and to design five-year plans according to the goals set by the government. By increasing liberalization of the Turkish economic policy, the DPT lost its importance, and was incorporated into the newly established Ministry of Development in June 2011.

Notable DPT people
 Nazım Ekren (born 1956), deputy prime minister responsible for the DPT (2007–2009)
 Ziya Müezzinoğlu (1919–2020), general director of the DPT between 1959 and 1960
 Turgut Özal (1927–1993), prime minister (1983–1989) and president (1989–1993); worked at the DPT in 1959

Notable projects 
 RASAT, remote sensing satellite launched in 2011, financed and operated by the DPT

References 

Government agencies of Turkey
1960 establishments in Turkey
Organizations based in Ankara
Government of Turkey
2011 disestablishments in Turkey
Defunct organizations based in Turkey
Defunct government agencies of Turkey